Lorraine Potocki (born August 18, 1961) is a medical geneticist and educator at Texas Children's Hospital and is a professor at Baylor College of Medicine.

She is credited with the discovery of two genetic syndromes, Potocki-Lupski syndrome and Potocki-Shaffer syndrome.

References

1961 births
Living people
American geneticists
Baylor College of Medicine faculty
Boston University School of Medicine alumni
American women geneticists